Francis Connolly Shannon (27 July 1874 – 1 February 1959) was an Irish actor and writer.

Career 
A stage actor and silent film pioneer, Shannon made his screen debut in 1913's The Artist's Joke. He later appeared in dozens of films through the mid-1920s, including The Prisoner of Zenda (1913) and Monsieur Beaucaire (1924). Shannon then returned to the stage until beckoned back to Hollywood in 1931 and played a few substantial supporting parts, including Captain McTavish in Warner Bros.' Torchy Blaine series from 1937 to 1939, but he is most fondly remembered as the brilliant scientist Dr. Alexis Zarkov in the three Flash Gordon serials starring Buster Crabbe between 1936 and 1940. He worked afterwards as a writer for the TV-series Tales of the Texas Rangers between 1955 and 1958.

Death 
Shannon died in Hollywood, Los Angeles, California at the age of 84. He is interred at Holy Cross Cemetery, Culver City, California.

Partial filmography

The Prisoner of Zenda (1913)
Perjury (1921) - Phil Rourke
Boomerang Bill (1922) - Terrence O'Malley
The Bride's Play (1922) - Sir John Mansfield
Icebound (1924) - Judge Bradford
Monsieur Beaucaire (1924) - Badger
Rasputin and the Empress (1932) - Staff General (uncredited)
Woman in the Dark (1934) - Prison Warden
G Men (1935) - Police Chief at Lodge (uncredited)
Men Without Names (1935) - Leahy
The Eagle's Brood (1935) - Henchman Mike
The Pace That Kills (1935) - Mr. Farley
The Murder of Dr. Harrigan (1936) - Police Sergeant (uncredited)
Black Gold (1936) - Dan O'Reilly
The Prisoner of Shark Island (1936) - Judge Advocate General Joseph Holt
Road Gang (1936) - Chaplain (uncredited)
Flash Gordon (1936, Serial) - Dr. Alexis Zarkov
Anthony Adverse (1936) - Major Domo (uncredited)
The Texas Rangers (1936) - Captain Stafford
End of the Trail (1936) - Sheriff Anderson
Nancy Steele Is Missing! (1937) - 1917 Warden (uncredited)
Affairs of Cappy Ricks (1937) - Captain Braddock
This Is My Affair (1937) - Root (uncredited)
Ever Since Eve (1937) - Desk Sergeant (uncredited)
High, Wide and Handsome (1937) - Peter's Man (uncredited)
Sophie Lang Goes West (1937) - Detective
Roll Along, Cowboy (1937) - Fred Morgan (uncredited)
The Adventurous Blonde (1937) - Cap. McTavish
Outlaws of the Prairie (1937) - Dart Collins Sr. (uncredited)
Mannequin (1937) - Police Sergeant at Jail (uncredited)
Blondes at Work (1938) - Cap. McTavish
Flash Gordon's Trip to Mars (1938, Serial) - Dr. Alexis Zarkov
Over the Wall (1938) -  Duke Slattery - Policeman with Warrant (uncredited)
Accidents Will Happen (1938) - Man on Crutches (uncredited)
Torchy Blane in Panama (1938) - Cap. McTavish
Holiday (1938) - Farmer (scenes deleted)
You Can't Take It with You (1938) - Mac (uncredited)
Torchy Gets Her Man (1938) - Cap. McTavish (uncredited)
Next Time I Marry (1938) - Police Lieutenant (uncredited)
Torchy Blane in Chinatown (1939) - Cap. McTavish
Union Pacific (1939) - Old Man (uncredited)
Torchy Runs for Mayor (1939) - Cap. McTavish
Torchy Blane... Playing with Dynamite (1939) - Inspector McTavish
Rulers of the Sea (1939) - Kelsey (uncredited)
The Night of Nights (1939) - Frank, the Bartender (uncredited)
Emergency Squad (1940) - Construction Supervisor at Elevator (uncredited)
Flash Gordon Conquers the Universe (1940, Serial) - Dr. Alexis Zarkov
The Return of Frank James (1940) - Sheriff
Wildcat Bus (1940) - Sweeney
Brigham Young (1940) - Second Man with California Gold News (uncredited)
A Dispatch from Reuters (1940) - Mr. O'Malley - Captain of the Nova Scotian (uncredited)
Dancing on a Dime (1940) - Policeman (uncredited)
Rage in Heaven (1941) - Workers' Delegate (uncredited)
Federal Fugitives (1941) - Col. Hammond
Rawhide Rangers (1941) - Ranger Captain McDowell
Unfinished Business (1941) - Groom's Father (uncredited)
Reap the Wild Wind (1942) - Captain in Café (uncredited)
Ten Gentlemen from West Point (1942) - Senator (uncredited)
The Secret Code (1942, Serial) - Police Commissioner [Ch.1]
Batman (1943, Serial) - Dr. Hayden (uncredited)
The Iron Major (1943) - Pa Cavanaugh (uncredited)
The Phantom (1943, Serial) - Prof. Davidson (uncredited)
The Desert Hawk (1944, Serial) - (uncredited)
Man Alive (1945) - Show Boat Character (uncredited)
Crack-Up (1946) - Train Station Gateman (uncredited)
A Dangerous Profession (1949) - Barman (uncredited) (final film role)

References

External links

 
 
 

1874 births
1959 deaths
Irish male film actors
Irish male silent film actors
Irish male stage actors
Male film serial actors
20th-century Irish male actors
Irish expatriate male actors in the United States